Lithuanian Personal Identity Card is the officially recognised  identity document issued to Lithuanian citizens.

Use

As an international travel document
The Personal Identity Card is a limited travel document, valid for travel within most European nations.

As personal identification
Aside from being unable to be used for international travel to other than previously mentioned countries, the passport card is treated as a passport for all other purposes. A Personal Identity Card can be used as primary evidence of Lithuanian citizenship, just like a passport and can be used as a valid proof of citizenship and proof of identity both inside and outside Lithuania

As electronic signature device
Since 2009, Personal Identity Cards are equipped with contact chips, allowing their usage as digital signature devices with a smart card reader. The Identity documents personalisation centre under the Lithuanian Ministry of the Interior provides digital signature software for Windows, Linux and Mac OS environments.

History
The first Lithuanian Personal Identity Cards were issued in January 2003. The issuance of these card continued until January, 2009, when they were superseded with biometric and digital signature-capable second-generation personal identity cards. In July 2012 issuance of slightly altered third-generation personal identity cards started.

See also

National identity cards in the European Union
Lithuanian passport
Identity document
e-Residency of Lithuania

References

External links
The official website of the Service of Technological Security of State Documents under the Ministry of Finance, Lithuania with information about the Lithuanian personal identity card

Identity documents of Lithuania
Lithuana